Komna is a mountain karst plateau in the Julian Alps in northwestern Slovenia. It has a triangular shape and rises above the Bohinj Basin. To the east, it continues into the Triglav Lakes Valley. The lowest measured temperatures in Slovenia were recorded at Komna in January 2009, reaching .

It is operated by the Ljubljana Matica Alpine Club.

References

External links

Karst plateaus of Slovenia
Julian Alps
Plateaus in Upper Carniola